The Ben Bolt-Palito Blanco Independent School District is located in Jim Wells County in South Texas off U.S. Route 281. The district contains three schools, two of which are located in Ben Bolt (high school, middle school), and an elementary in Palito Blanco.

The majority of Ben Bolt is in the district.

Finances
As of the 2010–2011 school year, the appraised valuation of property in the district was $70,626,000. The maintenance tax rate was $0.104 and the bond tax rate was $0.027 per $100 of appraised valuation.

Academic achievement
In 2011, the school district was rated "academically acceptable" by the Texas Education Agency.

Schools
In the 2011–2012 school year, the district had three open schools.
Ben Bolt-Palito Blanco High School
Ben Bolt Middle School (Grades 4-8)
Palito Blanco Elementary (Grades PK-3)

Notable alumni
 Sylvia Garcia, former Texas State Senator and current U.S. House of Representatives.

See also

List of school districts in Texas

References

External links
 

School districts in Jim Wells County, Texas